The 2007 Canterbury City Council election took place on 3 May 2007 to elect members of the Canterbury City Council in Kent, England. This was on the same day as other local elections. The Conservative Party retained control of the council, which had previously been under no overall control until 2005 when The Conservatives Party took control following a by election and defection from the Liberal Democrats.

References

2007 English local elections
May 2007 events in the United Kingdom
2007
2000s in Kent